Gibbons & Harris were manufacturers of narrow gauge geared steam locomotives between 1905-1912 in Auckland, New Zealand.

History 
The steam engines of these locomotives were based on the design of those used for winches of ships, as known to Gibbons & Harris from conducting a lot of ship repair work. The boilers were purchased from other engineering companies manufactured. The locomotive had an average life expectance of 25 years.

Locomotive #1, 1905  

0-4-0T locomotive #1 was the first locomotive built by Gibbons & Harris for Robert Pearce Gibbons, a brother of one of the founders, and a well-known Northland contractor and saw mill owner. The locomotive had horizontal cylinders underneath the smokebox and was driven through spur gears to the front axle. The drive was taken to the rear axle by means of a pair of coupling rods.

Technical data 
Gauge:  
Length:  
Wheelbase:  
Weight: 6 tonnes
Boiler pressure: 
Cylinders:  
Wheel diameter

Locomotive #3, 1905  

0-4-0T locomotive #3 was a small geared 4-wheeler. It weighed about 6 tonnes. The two-cylinder engine was mounted horizontally underneath the smoke box and was connected by spur gears to the front axle. Side rods coupled the front and rear drive wheels.

Technical data
Gauge:  
Length:  
Wheelbase:  
Weight: 6 tonnes
Boiler pressure: 
Cylinders:  
Wheel diameter

Locomotive #5, 1912  
0-4-0T locomotive #5 was a slightly longer geared 4-wheeler used by R.P. Gibbons. It is undergoing restoration at Te Aroha Mountain Railway, Te Aroha for eventual operation on a scenic bush tramway.

Technical data
Gauge:  
Length:  
Wheelbase:

References 

Locomotive manufacturers of New Zealand
Logging
Engineering companies of New Zealand
Manufacturing companies based in Auckland
Defunct manufacturing companies of New Zealand